The Adventures of Sir Prancelot is a British children's animated television programme written and produced by John Ryan for the John Ryan Studios company. It followed the adventures of Sir Prancelot, an eccentric inventor-knight who heads for the Crusades in the Holy Land. It was first transmitted on BBC 1 on Thursday, 13 January 1972.

Plot
To escape both his bank manager and his overbearing wife Lady Histeria, Prancelot decides to join the crusades. He is dismayed when he learns that Histeria intends to accompany him and eventually the entire household – including the children Sim and Sue, the miserly majordomo Girth, a cockney minstrel (who is also the show's narrator) and several serfs – set sail for adventure. They repeatedly fall foul of the dastardly Count Otto "The Blot" but always escape by some contrivance of Sir Prancelot himself. After many unlikely adventures they arrive in the Holy Land to discover they are 50 years too late. After a final showdown with Count Otto they return to England in a rocket ship also invented by Sir Prancelot.

Background
The Sir Prancelot animation came from the same stable as Captain Pugwash and was in a similar style.

Narration
All voices were performed by Peter Hawkins.  The story featured the narration of The Minstrel character, whose Cockney accent was rather reminiscent of Michael Caine. 
The music was composed by Alan Parker.

Characters
 Sir Prancelot, an inventor-knight and would-be Crusader
 Lady Histeria, Prancelot's wife
 Sim and Sue, their children
 Master Girth, the castle majordomo who administers the accounts
 The Minstrel, a cockney lute-player who also serves as the show's narrator
 Bert and Harry, the serfs (there were several other serfs who were never named)
 Pig William, Lady Histeria's pet pig (who she frequently refers to as Pigwig)
 Count Otto, the show's main antagonist, sworn enemy of Sir Prancelot
 Duke Uglio, a greedy and bad-tempered Italian aristocrat

Episodes
 Crumblecreek Crusade 
 The Lady Hysteria 
 A Few Items of Baggage 
 A Weighty Problem 
 On the Rocks 
 Count Otto 
 Thunderstruck 
 Landfall 
 Kidnapped 
 Hostile Enemy Intentions 
 The Haunted Watch-tower 
 The Flight 
 Flying Crusade 
 Duke Uglio 
 An Ugly Affair 
 Behind the Times 
 Not Cricket 
 Balloon Blitz 
 Ships of the Desert 
 A Nice Cup of tea
 Common Marker 
 Flying Carpet
 Open Sesame
 High Treason
 Homeward Bound
 Hurry to the Rescue
 Gold for Otto 
 Mystery in the Tower
 Blast Off
 Splash Down 
 Command Performance

References
  Little Gems Website – Sir Prancelot
 Little Gems Website – Episode Guide Part 1
 Little Gems Website – Episode Guide Part 2

External links 
 

1970s British children's television series
1972 British television series debuts
1972 British television series endings
British children's animated adventure television series
BBC children's television shows
1970s British animated television series